"Ms. Chocolate" is the first official single from Lil Jon's 2010 album Crunk Rock. The song features singers R. Kelly and Mario.

Background and release
In June 2006, Lil Jon announced that he planned to include collaborations with R. Kelly and Mario on a single.
The song was released on iTunes on March 30, 2010, just a few days after its premiere on MySpace.

Lil Jon stated that he is tired of hearing praises of light-skinned girls and dedicated a song to dark-skinned or "chocolate" girls.

Music video
The music video premiered May 10, it was shot in Columbus, Ohio.

Charts

References

2010 singles
R. Kelly songs
Mario (singer) songs
Lil Jon songs
Songs written by Lil Jon
Song recordings produced by Drumma Boy
Songs written by Claude Kelly
Songs written by R. Kelly
2007 songs
Crunk songs